RadhaKrishn is an Indian Hindi-language mythological television drama series that premiered on 1 October 2018 on Star Bharat and is also digitally available on Disney+ Hotstar. After a successful run of more than 4 years, it went off air on 21 January 2023. The series is based on the life of Hindu deities Radha and Krishna. It is produced by Siddharth Kumar Tewary, Rahul Kumar Tewary and Gayatri Gill Tewary for Swastik Productions and is directed by Rahul Kumar Tewary. The roles of Krishna and Radha are played by Sumedh Mudgalkar and Mallika Singh. It completed 1145 episodes and is listed among longest running television series of India and also became the longest ran mythological series.

A prequel of RadhaKrishn, titled Jai Kanhaiya Lal Ki, was telecast from 19 October 2021 to 4 July 2022.

Plot

Chapter 1 : Radha-Krishna's teenage

Krishna's devotee, Sridama curses Radha in Goloka to forget Krishna for 100 years and live in Bhuloka. This was a part of cosmic play as it was time for Krishna to make his entry into the mortal world. Radha and Krishna are reborn in Barsana and Mathura respectively.

Krishna is destined to kill his maternal uncle, Kamsa. Meanwhile, Ayan, Radha's friend loves Radha and he tries to separate Radha from Krishna. Krishna defeats Vyomasura, a demon whose marriage was fixed with Radha. Krishna removes all humanly weaknesses like bhaya (fear), moha (greed), krodha (anger), ghrina (hatred), irshya (envy), ahankara (pride) and heenbhavna (lack of self-confidence) out of Radha. In the process, she becomes closer to Krishna but is forced to marry Ayan. Later she realises that this marriage is merely an illusion as she can't marry anyone except Krishna because she is the incarnation of Lakshmi. Radha understands that her marriage is fake and eternally, she is Krishna's consort after Brahma completes Brahma Kalyāna (heavenly wedding) of Radha and Krishna in Goloka.

Krishna, along with Balarama, defeats the demons sent by Kamsa such as Putana, Bakasura, Aghasura, Timirasura, Sudarshana, Arishtasura, Keshi, Vyomasura, Dhenukasura, Ekadansha, Pralambasura, the evil enchanter Sammohana, and his 8 brothers who are defeated by Radha's Ashtalakshmi (8 incarnations of Lakshmi) avatars. Finally, Kans calls Krishna and Balaram to Mathura for killing them. However Balaram kills Kamsa's eight brothers and Krishna kills Kamsa. Krishna's biological parents Devaki and Vasudeva are freed from prison and Kana's imprisoned father Ugrasena is crowned king. Now, Krishna, Balarama and the Yadavas move to Dwaraka, their new home. Balarama marries Revati (Jyotishmati) in her earlier life, who loved Balarama as Shesha. Elsewhere, Krishna marries Rukmini. Later, Krishna also marries Satyabhama and Jambavati. He then kills the evil Narakasura and his general Mura.

Chapter 2 : Mahabharata

The Pandavas have escaped the lac-palace incident which was organised by their evil cousins – the Kauravas -Duryodhana and his brother Dushasana, their uncle Shakuni and Duryodhana's friend Karna. He helps Panchala king Drupada arrange a Swayamvara for his daughter Draupadi, who was born from a yajna. The third Pandava prince Arjuna wins Draupadi's svayamvara and marries her, however circumstances force Draupadi to marry all five Pandavas. The Pandavas receive a new kingdom Indraprastha, faraway from Hastinapura  due to the conflict with the Kauravas.

Krishna's sister Subhadra elopes with Arjuna, whereas Krishna kills the Pundra king Paundraka Vasudeva, an impostor. The second Pandava Bhima also kills the Magadha king Jarasandha. Pandavas soon perform Rajasuya Yagna where they gain supremacy over all of Aryavarta, where Krishna's cousin Shishupala interrupts the ceremony, only to be killed by Krishna. Later, Duryodhana organises a dice game with Shakuni wherein Pandavas lose all their wealth and are humiliated, while Krishna saves Draupadi from getting disrobed in the court by Dushasana. Later, the Pandavas and Draupadi are exiled for 13 years. Upon their return starts the Kurukshetra War, where Arjuna receives from Krishna, the knowledge of Bhagvad Gita. Shikhandi (who got a boon from Lord Shiva to kill Bhishma in her previous birth as Amba) kills Bhishma. Dhrishtadyumna kills Dronacharya, Arjuna kills Karna. Sahadeva kills Shakuni, whereas Bhima kills all the 100 Kauravas, with the war ending with the death of Duryodhana. Gandhari curses Krishna that the Yadava clan will be similarly destroyed. On the other hand, Krishna turns Ayan into a better person.

Chapter 3 : Punarmilan

Krishna returns to Dwaraka. Pradyumna returns to Dwaraka and marries Rukmavati, and a son Aniruddha is born to them. To Jambavati and Krishna, a son Samba is born, who is termed to be the reason for the Yadava destruction as cursed by Gandhari. Samba grows up to be short-tempered but loves his family, especially his mother; however he hates Radha. Later, Samba, Aniruddha and Balaram's sons Nishath and Ulmuk are sent to Gurukul along with Radha, and return after a few years, as teens. Aniruddha is kept in captivity at Shonitapura, the kingdom of Banasura, by his daughter Usha. This soon results in a war between Krishna and Banasura, wherein Shiva has to fight for Banasura due to his boon, resulting in a faceoff between Krishna and Shiva. Krishna defeats Shiva and punishes Banasura for kidnapping his grandson. Soon, Aniruddha is married to Usha while Samba is married to Hastinapur's Kaurava princess, Lakshmanaa, Duryodhana and Bhanumati's daughter. As Samba had previously joined hands with Banasura, he is cursed with leprosy by Krishna and Radha cures him using Mahamrityunjay Jaap. Later, Krishna marries Devi Yamuna.

Shankhchuda (rebirth of Sridama) enters the story who has a loving wife, Tulasi, who is his strength but he only uses her. With the help of Tulasi and her devotion for him, Shankhchuda got immense strength and he vows to destroy the whole universe. Krishna disguises himself as  Shankhchuda and goes to Tulasi to break her devotion. After Shankhchuda is killed, Tulasi feels cheated. She curses Krishna to become a stone (sālagrāma). However, Tulasi realises her mistake after she remembers her past. She decides to take her curse back and transforms herself into Tulsi plant. She then marries Krishna in this form and is told to remain on earth in that form. This displays Tulasi Kalyāna (Tulsi's wedding). Consequently, Hanuman visits Dwarka and witnesses Rama, Lakshman and Sita in Krishna, Balram and Radha respectively.

Lord Shiva suggests that Krishna should perform the Ashwamedh Yagya, for which he would need someone as his consort (ardhāngini). Krishna chooses Rukmini to sit with him for the yajna; to this his other queens object, claiming that they are equally eligible for sitting with him. Narada advised to perform Tulabhara (balancing) in order to find the perfect consort for Krishna. On the weighing scale, Krishna is in one balance and the other queens have to put their jewellery to win Krishna. Rukmini places a pair of bangles gifted by Krishna and a tulasi leaf, and wins him upon balancing the scale.

After Krishna's 100th Janmashtami, the time finally comes, when Sridama's curse come to an end and Radha remembers everything about Goloka and her true identity as a goddess and the consort of Krishna. Later, she kills Kaptasur, Shalva's accomplice and Krishna's lookalike, after she realises his evilness. Afterwards, Vidhurath, brother of Dantavakra, tries to kill Radha but gets executed by Krishna's Sudarshana Chakra.

Later, Samba insults Rishi Durvasa in disguise, only to get cursed to be the cause of Yadav tribe's destruction. Krishna lives in Vrindavan and Radha in Varsana to experience the love of their past. Following this, Radha completes her life on earth abiding by the curse of Shreedama and returns to Golok. Gandhari's curse to Krishna comes into effect, and a fight starts within the Yadav clan. The entire clan is decimated in the war. Post war, Dwarka submerges in the Arbian Sea. Later, Jara shoots Lord Krishna's left foot by mistake, resulting in his death. Lord Krishna and Radha unite in Goloka.

Cast and characters

Main

 Sumedh Mudgalkar as Krishna, Rama, Parashurama, Vishnu, Paundraka, Gopadevi, Gopika, Achyuta, Gopala, Govind, Madhava, Manmohana, Banke Bihari, Giridhari, Kaptasura, Mohini, Srinivas, Venkatesh (2018–2023)
 Mallika Singh as Radha, Sita, Bhumi, Lakshmi, Ashta Lakshmi, Alakshmi, Shitala, Madhavi, Vallabh, Kishori, Bhargavi (2018–2023)
 Basant Bhatt as Balarama, Lakshman, Shesha, Baldevi, Ananga Manjari, Govindraja and Bharya (2018–2023)

Recurring 
 Himanshu Soni as Krishna of Goloka (2018) 
 Shivya Pathania as Radha of Goloka (2018)
 Tarun Khanna as Shiva and Hanuman (2018–2023)
 Piyali Munsi as Parvati, Sati, Siddhidatri, Durga, Mahakali, Bhadrakali (2018–2023)
 Ganesh Pai as Hans(2022)
 Zalak Desai as Rukmini, Padmavathi (2019–2023) 
 Pratik Parihar as Prince Vasudev (2022)
 Nisha Nagpal/Shalini Vishnudev as Saraswati (2020–2021)/(2021–2023)
 Amardeep Garg as Brahma (2018-2023)
 Kumar Hegde as Narada (2018–2023)
 Raman Thukral as Ganesha (2019–2023)
 Manish Bishla as Indra (2019–2023)
 Harsh Vashisht as Sridama of Goloka (2018–2023)
 Falaq Naaz as Devaki (2018–2023)
 Naveen Jinger as Vasudeva (2018–2023)
 Arpit Ranka as Kansa (2018–2023)
 Gavie Chahal as Nanda Baba (2018–2019; 2022)
 Reena Kapoor/Aditi Sajwan as Yashoda (2018–2019)/(2022–2023)
 Vasundhara Kaul as Rohini Devi (2018–2019)
 Rakesh Kukreti as Vrishabhanu (2018–2019)/(2022–2023)
 Akangsha Rawat as Kirtida (2018–2019)/(2022–2023)
 Runav Shah as Bal Krishna (2018–2020)
 Myra Rajpal as Bal Radha (2018–2020)
 Hazel Gaur as Bal Krishna (2022)
 Nimai Bali as Ugrapath (2018–2020)
 Malini Sengupta as Jatila (2018–2020)
 Rushiraj Pawar as Ayan (2018–2020)
 Harsha Khandeparkar as Kutila (2019–2020)
 Monika Chauhan/Kanchan Dubey as Revati (2019–2021)/(2021–2023)
 Vaidehi Nayar / Manisha Saxena / Unknown as Jambavati (2020)/(2020–2021)
 Aleya Ghosh as Satyabhama (2020–2021)
 Kajol Srivastav as Kalindi or Goddess Yamuna (2021)
 Joohi Pal as Mitravinda (2021)
 Nishi Saxena as Nagnajiti or Satya (2021)
 Payal Gupta as Bhadra (2021)
 Neha Tiwari as Lakshmana or Charuhasini (2021)
 Kunwar Vikram Soni/Kunal Gaud as Pradyumna (2020)/(2021-2022)
 Kartikey Malviya as Samba (2020–2023)
 Tisha Kapoor / Unknown as Lakshmanaa (2020–2022)
 Bhavesh Balchandani/Saurav Singh as Aniruddha (2020)/(2021–2022)
 Harsh Mehta as Nishatha (2020–2022)
 Devesh Sharma as Ulmuka (2020–2022)
 Preeti Verma as Chandravali (2019)
 Mukul Raj Singh as Govardhan (2019)
 Rajesh Chahar as Subal (2018–2019)
 Tanishq Seth as Chutki (2018–2019)
 Richa Rathore as Rukmavati (2020)
 Aswin Patil as Damma (2018–2019)
 Resha Konkar as Kunti (2020)
 Ishita Ganguly as Draupadi (2020)
 Kanan Malhotra as Yudhishthira (2020)
 Zuber Ali as Bhima (2020)
 Kinshuk Vaidya as Arjuna (2020)
 Ujjwal Sharma as Nakula (2020)
 Vikas Singh as Sahadeva (2020)
 Krip Suri as Duryodhana (2020)
 Ankit Gulati as Dushasana (2020)
 Malhar Pandya as Karna (2020)
 Sachin Verma as Bhishma (2020)
Hemant Choudhary as Guru Dronacharya (2020)
 Sai Ballal as Shakuni (2020)
 Vinit Kakar as Shishupala (2020)
 Ansha Sayed as Shikhandini (2020)
 Aanchal Goswami/Nikita Tiwari as Subhadra (2020)/(2021–2022)
 Saurabh Raj Jain as Narrator (2018)
 Pooja Sharma as Yogmaya (2018)
 Sumedh Mudgalkar as Shuka (2019-2020)
 Vinit Kakar as Garuda (2020)
 Chetan Hansraj as Ravana (2019)
 Harsh Vashisht as Shankhachuda (2021)
 Meghan Jadhav as Vyomasur (2019)
 Deepak Bhatia as Shukracharya
 Jiten Lalwani as Maharishi Bhrigu (2022)

Soundtrack 
The original music of the series is composed by Surya Raj Kamal with the background score by Jitesh Panchal and Sushant Pawar. Lyrics are penned by Shekhar Astitwa, Neetu Pandey Kranti, Vikas Chauhan, Dr. Kannan, and others. The shlokas, mantras, and excerpts from various Hindu mythology scriptures and texts like Bhagavata Purana and Brahma Vaivarta Purana have been transformed into various themes. Popular devotional songs like Shri Krishna Govind Hare Murari, Govind Bolo Hari Gopal Bolo, and Bolo Jai Kanhaiya Lal Ki have also been recreated. Some shlokas, bhajans, songs, and background music from Swastik's another magnum opus series Mahabharat are also used in the series. Surya Raj Kamal has composed more than 20 original compositions for Raasleela of Radha-Krishn. Star Bharat in December 2018 uploaded a video consisting of 14 songs from the series till that date.

Production

Development
The series is one of the most expensive series on Indian Television as ₹150 crore is said to have been spent by Swastik Productions. Shooting took place in Umbergaon, a suburb in Gujarat, India. The series was

mainly shot in front of a green/blue screen.
Shibhapriya Swas is the set and costume designer who was inspired from their descriptions in scriptures, as well as different paintings. Surya Raj Kamwas is the music director of the show who composed various themes. Thewere re approximately 500 members of the crew.

Casting
In 2017, Chahat Pandey was first cast as the lead Radha opposite Sumedh Mudgalkar while Madirakshi Mundle and Siddharth Arora as Goloka RadhaKrishna. They also starred in the show's first teaser, however, were replaced by Mallika Singh, Shivya Pathania and Himanshu Soni due to creative differences.

Reception
Even though RadhaKrishn did not prove to be as successful as Mahabharat but it did become popular. The series opened up with 6.427 million impressions and was the sixth most watched urban television in its debut week in India, ranking in a TRP of 2.9. In the first week of December 2018, it was at fifth position with 6.6 million impressions. It started to get low ratings when Star Bharat shifted to a pay channel. It had an average 0.5 TRP in 2020 and 2021.

Prequel

In June, it was announced that a prequel show will be launched, highlighting the early days of Lord Krishna. It has been titled as Jai Kanhaiya Lal Ki. It premiered on 19 October 2021 and ended on 4 July 2022.

References

External links
 
 

Indian television series about Hindu deities
2018 Indian television series debuts
Hindi-language television shows
Indian television series
Star Bharat original programming
Krishna in popular culture